Paavo Sepponen (30 October 1923 – 6 November 1998) was a Finnish wrestler. He competed at the 1948 Summer Olympics and the 1952 Summer Olympics.

References

External links
 

1923 births
1998 deaths
Finnish male sport wrestlers
Olympic wrestlers of Finland
Wrestlers at the 1948 Summer Olympics
Wrestlers at the 1952 Summer Olympics
People from Alavus
Sportspeople from South Ostrobothnia
20th-century Finnish people